The Miller's House is a historic house on Old Wye Mills Road in Talbot County near Wye Mills, Maryland.  The -story brick building was built c. 1770 by Edward Lloyd III, the owner of Wye Mill, for the miller to live in.  The house as three bays, with a central door, and chimneys set in the outer walls.  The house was built at a time when Talbot County's agricultural base was gradually shifting from tobacco to grain crops, and the Lloyds probably built the house to attract and retain skilled millers.

The house was listed on the National Register of Historic Places in 2010.

See also
National Register of Historic Places listings in Talbot County, Maryland

References

External links
, including undated photo, at Maryland Historical Trust

Houses on the National Register of Historic Places in Maryland
Houses in Talbot County, Maryland
Georgian architecture in Maryland
Houses completed in 1770
National Register of Historic Places in Talbot County, Maryland
1770 establishments in Maryland